Gunmetal is a kind of bronze.

Gunmetal, gunmetal gray or gunmetal grey may refer to:

 Gunmetal (color), a shade of gray

Arts, media and entertainment
 Gunmetal (video game), a 1998 first person shooter game
 Gun Metal (video game), a 2002 3D shooting game
 Gunmetal Grey, a metalcore band from San Francisco, US
 Gun Metal Grey, a Hong Kong TV show
 Gunmetal Gray, a 2017 novel